Paul Joseph Rock Jr. is a United States Marine Corps major general currently serving as commander of United States Marine Forces Central Command. Previously, he served as the Director of Strategy and Plans at HQMC; Deputy Commanding General of the III Marine Expeditionary Force and Commanding General of the 3rd Marine Expeditionary Brigade from July 26, 2019 to July 10, 2020. Rock is a 1988 graduate of the United States Naval Academy. After flight training, he was designated a naval aviator in 1990.

References

External links

Year of birth missing (living people)
Living people
Place of birth missing (living people)
United States Naval Academy alumni
United States Naval Aviators
United States Marine Corps generals